Visegrad, meaning in Slavic languages the "upper town" (or "acropolis"), may refer to:

Places
 Višegrad (disambiguation)
 Vishegrad, Kardzhali Province, a village in Bulgaria
 Vishegrad, the highest peak of Sakar Mountain in Bulgaria
 Visegrád, a town and castle in Hungary
 Vyšehrad, district of Prague, Czech Republic
 Vyšehrad, a castle in Prague, Czech Republic
 Vyšehrad (Prague Metro), the subway station that serves it

Other uses
 The Visegrád Group, a cultural and political alliance between the Czech Republic, Hungary, Poland, and Slovakia
 The Visegrád Privilege, an important document of the Republic of Dubrovnik 

See also
 Vyshgorod (disambiguation)
 Wyszogród (disambiguation)